Jason Hinds (born 15 February 1984) is a Barbadian cricketer. He played in one Twenty20 match for the Barbados cricket team in 2010.

See also
 List of Barbadian representative cricketers

References

External links
 

1984 births
Living people
Barbadian cricketers
Barbados cricketers
People from Saint James, Barbados